Scott City may refer to a place in the United States:

 Scott City, Indiana
 Scott City, Kansas
 Scott City, Missouri
 Scott City, Atchison County, Missouri